Tong is a  boma in  Baidit payam, Bor West County, Jonglei State, South Sudan, about 30 kilometers north of Bor.
The village is located at the southern extent of the  sudd, South Sudan's central wetlands, near to the east bank of the  Bahr al Jabal River.

Demographics
According to the Fifth Population and Housing Census of Sudan, conducted in April 2008, Tong  boma had a population of 3,334 people, composed of 1,711 male and 1,623 female residents.

Notes

References 

Populated places in Jonglei State